Bareilly Assembly constituency is one of the 403 constituencies of the Uttar Pradesh Legislative Assembly, India. It is a part of the Bareilly district and one of the five assembly constituencies in the Bareilly Lok Sabha constituency. First election in this assembly constituency was held in 2012 after the "Delimitation of Parliamentary and Assembly Constituencies Order, 2008" was passed and the constituency was formed in 2008. The constituency is assigned identification number 124.
And Baheri town is the largest Tahseel of zila Bareilly, settled with Muslim Majority. Meena Bazar is a famous place in Baheri and known around the other places as a great hub for Ladies' shopping. VVPAT facility with EVMs will be here in the 2017 U.P assembly polls.

Wards  / Areas
Extent of Bareilly Assembly constituency is Ward Nos. 3, 4, 7, 12 to 15, 18, 19, 22, 23, 24, 26, 28 to 32, 36, 376, 39, 41, 461, 55, 56 in Bareilly (M Corp.) & Northern Railway Colony (OG) – Ward No. 61 of Bareilly Tehsil.

Members of Legislative Assembly

Election results

2022

2017

See also
Aonla Lok Sabha constituency
Bareilly district
Sixteenth Legislative Assembly of Uttar Pradesh
Uttar Pradesh Legislative Assembly
Vidhan Bhawan

References

External links
 

Assembly constituencies of Uttar Pradesh
Bareilly
Constituencies established in 2008
Politics of Bareilly district